The Gifford Farm is a historic farmhouse in Barnstable, Massachusetts.  The -story Cape style house was built c. 1850, and is an unusual local instance of a double house.  Rather than having five bays, a traditional Cape organization, it has a pair of entrances flanked by pairs of windows.  The house was probably built by Russell Hinckley; it was a major social center in the early decades of the 20th century, when it was owned by Lorenzo Gifford.

The house was listed on the National Register of Historic Places in 1987.

See also
National Register of Historic Places listings in Barnstable County, Massachusetts

References

Houses in Barnstable, Massachusetts
National Register of Historic Places in Barnstable, Massachusetts
Houses on the National Register of Historic Places in Barnstable County, Massachusetts
Greek Revival houses in Massachusetts